Humby may refer to:

Places
Great Humby, a village near Grantham in Lincolnshire, England;
Little Humby, a village near Grantham in Lincolnshire, England;
Ropsley and Humby, a civil parish in Lincolnshire, England;

Surnames
Alison Humby (born 1972), English badminton player
Baxter Humby, Canadian kickboxer
Dana Humby (born 1979), New Zealand association football player
Harold Humby (1879–1923), British sport shooter